Pink Strat is the debut album from Canadian musician Bahamas. It was nominated for both a Juno and a Polaris Music Prize in 2010.

Track listing

References

2009 debut albums
Bahamas (musician) albums